Assad al Zubi (born 1956) is a Sunni Free Syrian Army general, who defected from the Syrian Army to the FSA. He joined Syria's air force academy in 1974, graduating in 1977 with the rank of lieutenant and then rose through the ranks to become a brigadier general. He also worked as a military consultant in Yemen for more than two years. He currently holds a leading position in the Southern Front. Before his defection, he served in the Syrian Arab Air Force and was head of the air force branch of the Supreme Syrian Military Academy.
In January 2016, al-Zubi was named Head of the opposition delegation team to the 3rd Geneva conference on the future of Syria.

References

People of the Syrian civil war
Syrian generals
Living people
1956 births